The Old Palace of John Whitgift School is a selective independent school for girls in Croydon, London. The Old Palace is protected as a Grade I listed building.

It consists of a pre-school for the ages of 3-4, a preparatory department for the ages of 4-11 and a senior school for pupils aged 11–18. The school is operated by the Whitgift Foundation, along with Whitgift School and Trinity School of John Whitgift, and is consistently ranked as one of the top performing independent girls' schools in London.

History 

The school was founded in 1889 by the Sisters of the Church. The "Old Palace" itself was for 500 years the summer residence of the Archbishops of Canterbury. In the 19th century the Archbishops ended their residence at Croydon Palace and used Addington Palace, also in Croydon, instead. The Palace was sold and subsequently used as a bleaching factory, amongst other things. The building was rescued by the Duke of Newcastle in 1887 and given to the Sisters Of The Church who used it for educational purposes.

In 1945, the school became a Direct Grant Grammar School and in 1975, became a fully independent day school for girls. The school joined the Whitgift Foundation in 1993. The school merged with Croham Hurst School, a former independent school, in 2008.
It is also home to a suspected ghost – The Green Lady – who was said to have lived there around the time of Queen Elizabeth I.

Grounds 

The senior school building was for centuries the summer palace of the Archbishops of Canterbury. It began life as the manor house, part wooden from at least the 12th century, and stone from the 14th century. The core of today’s palace was built in the 15th century. The guardroom – once a reception room, now a library – dates from the time of Archbishop Thomas Arundel (1396-1414), and is one of the earliest uses of brick in Britain. Archbishop John Stafford (died 1452) built what is now one of the finest medieval great halls left in southern England. A number of monarchs from Henry VI to Elizabeth I banqueted under its high arched-brace roof, each sitting on Stafford’s stone throne, part of which survives against the west wall. Elizabeth made numerous visits, and her bed, always travelling with her, was set down in what is now known as Queen Elizabeth’s room, a large 15th-century first-floor space, with moulded ceiling joists. The chapel dates from the 15th century, and includes a gallery pew in dark oak often referred to as ‘Queen Elizabeth’s Pew', built by Archbishop William Laud. Beneath this is a Norman font gifted in Victorian times from St George’s Church, Southwark, the same font where Charles Dickens had Little Dorrit christened.
 
The senior school also houses modern, purpose-built facilities including seven laboratories, a heated indoor swimming pool, and an Art and Technology building. In 2001 a building for the Junior Department and one housing the Sixth Form and P.E. area were opened. The school also benefits from access to Whitgift Foundation grounds and facilities.

Today, the pre-school and preparatory school are on a separate site to the senior school, on Melville Avenue in South Croydon.  The preparatory and pre-school buildings used to be Croham Hurst School before they were acquired by Old Palace.

Notable former pupils 

Jane Featherstone - television producer
Sarah Jones - Labour MP for Croydon Central from 2017
Helen Young - weather forecaster and television presenter
Sonia Sodha - columnist
Jane Steen - Church of England Bishop of Lynn in Norfolk

Houses
All students are assigned to one of four houses named after notable people associated with the Palace. The houses, and their colours, are Anselm (yellow), Hatton (green), Laud (purple), and Stafford (blue).

References

External links

 Old Palace School website
 Old Palace Old Girls' Association website

Private schools in the London Borough of Croydon
Educational institutions established in 1889
Private girls' schools in London
1889 establishments in England
Church of England private schools in the Diocese of Southwark